Wallace S. McElwain (1832-1882) was an American businessman.

Early life
Wallace Scott McElwain was born in 1832. He was trained in a gun factory in New York and in a foundry in Ohio.

Career
McElwain co-founded the Jones, McElwain and Company Iron Foundry in Holly Springs, Mississippi. Some of their railings in the Hillcrest Cemetery are listed on the National Register of Historic Places. Many railings are also present in New Orleans, Louisiana.

During the Civil War, he made guns for the Confederate States Army.

Death
McElwain died in 1882.

References

External links
Historical marker

1832 births
1882 deaths
People from Holly Springs, Mississippi
19th-century American businesspeople